Dame Sarah Jane Whatmore  (born 25 September 1959) is a British geographer. She is a professor of environment and public policy at Oxford University. She is a professorial fellow at Keble College, moving from Linacre College in 2012. She was associate head (research) of the Social Sciences Division of the university from 2014 to 2016, and became pro-vice chancellor (education) of Oxford in January 2017. From 2018 she has been head of the Social Sciences Division.

Background
Born in Aldershot, Hampshire into a military family, Whatmore moved often - including Germany, Cyprus, and Hong Kong. She studied geography at University College London (BA 1981), has an MPhil (Town Planning) in 1983 (Financial institutions and the ownership of agricultural land) and worked at the Greater London Council. She returned to UCL for a PhD supervised by Richard Munton (The 'other half' of the family farm: an analysis of the position of 'farm wives' in the familial gender division of labor on the farm, 1988) and lectured at Leeds University, Bristol University (1989-2001) and the Open University (2001-2004).  She lives in Upton, Oxfordshire.

Scholarship

Whatmore began studying rural geography, gender and alternative food networks, moving into the critical geography of environmental issues at the end of the 1990s. She has questioned Marxist materialist approaches in favour of actor-network theory and feminist science studies. Her approach, laid out in her 2002 book Hybrid Geographies, attempts to develop what she terms "more than human" modes of inquiry, and question the relationship between science and democracy. Hybrid Geographies has been cited over 1,800 times.

Her research focuses on the treatment of evidence and role of expertise in environmental governance, against growing reliance on computer modelling techniques. It is characterized by a commitment to experimental and collaborative research practices that bring the different knowledge competences of social and natural scientists into play with those of diverse local publics living with environmental risks and hazards like floods and droughts. Her ideas were developed further in Political Matter (Whatmore & Braun eds. 2010).

Her critical ideas have been well received by theorists, but less so by policy-oriented environmental thinkers and traditional geographers less inclined to "theorise" human-environment relationships. Nonetheless, she has been a member of the Science Advisory Council to the Department for Environment, Food and Rural Affairs (DEFRA) and chair of its Social Science Expert Group; a member of the Science Advisory Group established to advise the Cabinet Office’s National Flood Resilience Review (2016), and as a member of the board of the Parliamentary Office of Science and Technology.

Honours and awards
2013: Ellen Churchill Semple award, Department of Geography, University of Kentucky
 2014: Fellow of the British Academy, the United Kingdom's national academy for the humanities and social sciences.
 Fellow, Academy of Social Sciences
 DSc, University of Bristol.
 2020: Dame Commander of the Order of the British Empire (DBE) in the 2020 New Year Honours for services to the study of environmental policy

Selected bibliography  
 
 
 Nigel Thrift and Sarah Whatmore (eds.). 2004. Cultural geography: critical concepts in the social sciences. London: Routledge.
 
 
 Sarah Whatmore, Terry Marsden, Philip Lowe (eds.) 1994. Gender and rurality. London: David Fulton Publishers.
 Philip Lowe, Terry Marsden, Sarah Whatmore (eds.). 1994. Regulating agriculture. London: David Fulton Publishers. 
 Sarah Whatmore. 1991. Farming women: gender, work and family enterprise. Basingstoke: Macmillan.
 Terry Marsden, Philip Lowe, Sarah Whatmore (eds) 1992. Labour and locality: uneven development and the rural labour process". London: David Fulton Publishers.
 Terry Marsden, Philip Lowe, Sarah Whatmore (eds.). 1990. Rural restructuring: global processes and their responses. London: David Fulton Publishers.
 Philip Lowe, Terry Marsden, Sarah Whatmore (eds.). 1990. Technological change and the rural environment''. London: David Fulton Publishers.

References 

Living people
English geographers
Fellows of Keble College, Oxford
Fellows of Linacre College, Oxford
Alumni of University College London
Fellows of the Academy of Social Sciences
Fellows of the British Academy
1959 births
Women geographers
Dames Commander of the Order of the British Empire
Scientists from Aldershot